Townville may refer to:
 Townville, Pennsylvania, a borough in Crawford County
 Townville, South Carolina, an unincorporated community in Anderson County
 Townville Cricket Club, a club from Castleford, who play in the Bradford Cricket League

See also 
 Townsville (disambiguation)